François Gravé (Saint-Malo, November 1560 – 1629 or soon after), said Du Pont (or Le Pont, Pontgravé...), was a Breton navigator (captain on the sea and on the "Big River of Canada"), an early fur trader and explorer in the New World.

Life
François Gravé Du Pont came from the great seaport of Saint-Malo, on the coast of Brittany. Gravé Du Pont had borne arms before becoming a merchant. He is known to have traded furs in the New France, since maybe 1580, surely before 1599, reaching Trois-Rivières in that year.

In 1599, he and Pierre de Chauvin de Tonnetuit founded a fur trading post at Tadoussac. He would have liked to go farther up the river, but his partner refused to do any exploring.

In 1603 he returned there, with two Montagnais Indians having lived in France for the last year, and accompanied by a new observer, Samuel de Champlain, his nephew. They met with Begourat and Anadabijou, chiefs of the Montagnais Innu, who summered in the Tadoussac area, at a tabagie feast, and made a strong alliance with them and their nation. That summer, Du Pont went with Champlain exploring the Saint Lawrence River as far as the falls later called Chute de la Rivière Saint-Louis in Beauharnois, Quebec and made a new inventory of the St. Lawrence River, after which he resumed fur trading, this time for Aymar de Chaste, who had succeeded the deceased Chauvin as monopoly holder.

In 1604, Gravé Du Pont was in the service of Pierre Dugua, Sieur de Mons, who had been given a fur trade monopoly for Acadia. They sailed with 79 men and explored the Bay of Fundy. De Monts decided to stay on an island on the St. Croix River on the western side of the Bay of Fundy.  It was thought that the area offered protection from raiders. Francois Grave Du Pont and Jean de Biencourt de Poutrincourt sailed back to France before winter. Grave Du Pont arrived back at St. Croix in June 1605 with 2 ships, men, and supplies.  They spent 6 weeks exploring the coast (all the way down to Cape Cod) to find a better place to settle.  They chose a spot on the north side, opposite Goat Island, which became Port-Royal.  They built structures at Port Royal using the materials from the buildings they had constructed on Ile St. Croix.

In Spring of 1608, two ships set sail from France: the Lévrier, under the command of Dupont-Gravé (François Gravé, Sieur du Pont, who was also in charge of the expedition), departed on April 5; the Don de Dieu, under the command of Samuel de Champlain, departed on April 13. On June 3, Champlain arrived in Tadoussac (the only inland trading post and used by all the major European countries) on the north shore of the St. Lawrence River only to discover that Dupont-Gravé had immediately tried to impose the trade monopoly on the Basque and Spanish captains and had been answered with muskets and cannons. Dupont-Gravé was seriously wounded. Champlain managed to negotiate a truce with the other traders and Dupont-Gravé agreed to share the trade with the Montagnais.

From 1608 to 1629, Du Pont returned to the Saint Lawrence River.

References 

1560 births
1629 deaths
Canadian fur traders
Acadia
Pre-Confederation Nova Scotia people
Pre-Confederation Quebec people
People from Saint-Malo
Businesspeople from Brittany
Explorers of Canada
French explorers
16th-century Breton people
17th-century Breton people
Emigrants from France to New France